Functions of Language is a peer-reviewed academic journal that covers the field of linguistics treated from a functional perspective. It has been published by John Benjamins since 1994. The current editors in chief are Martin Hilpert (University of Neuchâtel), J. Lachlan Mackenzie (Free University Amsterdam), and Monika Bednarek (University of Sydney).

External links 
 

Linguistics journals
Publications established in 1994
English-language journals
John Benjamins academic journals
Biannual journals